This is a list of qualifying teams for the 2016 NCAA Division I men's basketball tournament. A total of 68 teams entered the tournament. Thirty-one of the teams earned automatic bids by winning their conference tournaments. The automatic bid of the Ivy League, which did not conduct a postseason tournament, went to its regular season champion. The remaining 36 teams were granted at-large bids, which were extended by the NCAA Selection Committee. The Selection Committee seeded the entire field from 1 to 68, and seeded teams 1 to 16 within their regionals.

Qualifying teams

Automatic bids
Automatic bids to the tournament were granted for winning a conference championship tournament, except for the automatic bid of the Ivy League given to the regular season champion. Seeds listed were seeds within the conference tournaments. Runners-up in bold face were given at-large berths.

* ineligible for NCAA tournament due to violations

At-large bids

Listed by region and seeding 

*See First Four

Conferences with multiple bids

Automatic conference bids in bold

Bids by state

References

NCAA Division I men's basketball tournament qualifying teams
 
qualifying teams